Francismar Carioca de Oliveira (born 18 April 1984 in Ubá, Minas Gerais) is a Brazilian association footballer who plays for Ipatinga.

Career 
On 6 March 2009 the attacking midfielder, has left Esporte Clube Juventude to join Atlético Goianiense.

Club statistics

Achievements
 Campeonato Mineiro: 2006
 Campeonato Brasileiro Série D: 2014

References

External links
 
 
 
 Francismar at ZeroZero

1984 births
Living people
Brazilian footballers
Brazilian expatriate footballers
Campeonato Brasileiro Série A players
Campeonato Brasileiro Série B players
K League 1 players
Expatriate footballers in Japan
Expatriate footballers in South Korea
Brazilian expatriate sportspeople in South Korea
Association football midfielders
América Futebol Clube (MG) players
Cruzeiro Esporte Clube players
Kawasaki Frontale players
Tokyo Verdy players
Esporte Clube Juventude players
Atlético Clube Goianiense players
Ipatinga Futebol Clube players
Clube Náutico Capibaribe players
Grêmio Barueri Futebol players
Agremiação Sportiva Arapiraquense players
Villa Nova Atlético Clube players
Clube Atlético Penapolense players
Boa Esporte Clube players
Tombense Futebol Clube players
Incheon United FC players
CR Vasco da Gama players
Boavista Sport Club players
Associação Atlética Caldense players
Esporte Clube Democrata players
Rio Claro Futebol Clube players
São Bernardo Futebol Clube players
People from Ubá
Sportspeople from Minas Gerais